Tingena horaea is a species of moth in the family Oecophoridae. It is endemic to New Zealand and have been observed in both the North and South Islands. The adults are on the wing in January.

Taxonomy
This species was first described by Edward Meyrick in 1883 using specimens collected at Hamilton and the Bealey River in January. Meyrick originally named the species Oecophora horaea. Meyrick went on to give a fuller description of the species in 1884. In 1915 Meyrick placed this species within the Borkhausenia genus. In 1926 Alfred Philpott was unable to study the genitalia of the male of this species as it was not represented in collections in New Zealand.  George Hudson discussed this species under the name Borkhausenia horaea in his 1928 publication The butterflies and moths of New Zealand. In 1988 J. S. Dugdale placed this species in the genus Tingena. The male lectotype specimen is held at the Natural History Museum, London.

Description
Meyrick originally described this species as follows:

Meyrick gave a fuller description as follows:

It has been suggested that this species differs from other close relatives as it has a distinctive ochreous shade to its forewings. However Dugdale pointed out that both the genitalia as well as the hindwing anal fold powder puff of this species were similar to its close relatives T. serena and T. anaema. Dugdale also states that of the 9 paralectotype specimens in the series collected by Meyrick, at least four specimens appear to be T. actinias.

Distribution
This species is endemic to New Zealand and has been observed in both the North and South Islands.

Behaviour 
The adults of this species are on the wing in January.

References

Oecophoridae
Moths of New Zealand
Moths described in 1883
Endemic fauna of New Zealand
Taxa named by Edward Meyrick
Endemic moths of New Zealand